EuroLeague, known as the Turkish Airlines EuroLeague for sponsorship reasons, is a European professional basketball club competition. The league is widely recognised as the top-tier league in Europe. The league consists of 18 teams, of which 16 are given long-term licences and wild cards, making the league a semi-closed league. The league was first organized by FIBA in 1958, subsequently by ULEB in 2000 and then solely the Euroleague Basketball.

The competition was introduced in 1958 as the FIBA European Champions Cup (renamed to the FIBA EuroLeague in 1996), which operated under FIBA's umbrella until Euroleague Basketball was created for the 2000–01 season. The FIBA European Champions Cup and the EuroLeague are considered to be the same competition, with the change of name being simply a re-branding.

The EuroLeague is one of the most popular indoor sports leagues in the world, with an average attendance of 8,780 for league matches in the 2017–18 season. This was the fifth-highest of any professional indoor sports league in the world (the highest outside the United States), and the second-highest of any professional basketball league in the world, only behind the National Basketball Association (NBA).

The EuroLeague title has been won by 22 clubs, 14 of which have won the title more than once. The most successful club in the competition is Real Madrid, with ten titles. The current champion is Anadolu Efes, which defeated Real Madrid in the 2022 final, winning the club's second and back-to-back Euroleague title.

History

The FIBA European Champions Cup was originally established by FIBA and it operated under its umbrella from 1958 until the summer of 2000, concluding with the 1999–00 season. Euroleague Basketball was created after the end of the FIBA European Champions Cup.

FIBA had previously used the EuroLeague name for the competition since 1996 but had never trademarked the name. As FIBA had no legal recourse on the usage of the name, it started a new league named the FIBA SuproLeague. The following 2000–2001 season started with two top European professional club basketball competitions: FIBA SuproLeague (renamed from FIBA EuroLeague) and Euroleague.

Top clubs were split between the two leagues: Panathinaikos, Maccabi Tel Aviv, CSKA Moscow and Efes Pilsen stayed with FIBA, while Olympiacos, Kinder Bologna, Real Madrid Teka, FC Barcelona, Paf Wennington Bologna,  Žalgiris Kaunas, Benetton Treviso, AEK and Tau Cerámica joined Euroleague Basketball.

In May 2001, Europe had two continental champions, Maccabi of the FIBA SuproLeague and Kinder Bologna of the Euroleague. Both organizations realized the need to come up with a unified competition and Euroleague Basketball negotiated terms and dictated proceedings which FIBA agreed to their terms. As a result, European club competition was fully integrated under Euroleague Basketball's umbrella and teams that competed in the FIBA SuproLeague during the 2000–01 season joined it as well.

The authority in European professional basketball was divided over club-country lines. FIBA stayed in charge of national team competitions (like the FIBA EuroBasket, the FIBA World Cup, and the Summer Olympics), while Euroleague Basketball took over the European professional club competitions. From that point on, FIBA's Korać Cup and Saporta Cup competitions lasted one more season and then Euroleague Basketball launched the ULEB Cup, now known as the EuroCup.

League era
In November 2015, Euroleague Basketball and IMG agreed on 10-year joint venture. Both Euroleague Basketball and IMG will manage the commercial operation, and the management of all global rights covering both media and marketing. The deal was worth €630 million guaranteed over 10 years, with projected revenues reaching €900 million. Along with the deal the league changed into a true league format, with 16 teams playing each other team in the regular season followed by the playoffs. The A-licensed clubs were assured of participation for the following ten years in the new format.
After the new format of the EuroLeague and FIBA implementing national team windows, a conflict between the two organizations emerged. EuroLeague has been criticised by FIBA as well as several national federations for creating a 'closed league' and ignoring the principle of meritocracy. In July 2019, EuroLeague announced that from the 2019–20 season there will be no direct access to the league through domestic leagues anymore.

Title sponsorship

On 26 July 2010, Turkish Airlines and Euroleague Basketball announced a €15 million strategic agreement to sponsor the top European basketball competition across the globe. According to the agreement, starting with the 2010–11 season, the top European competition would be named Turkish Airlines Euroleague Basketball. Similarly, the EuroLeague Final Four would be named the Turkish Airlines EuroLeague Final Four, whereby the new league title would appear in all media accordingly. This title partnership was set to run for five seasons, with the option of extending it to an additional five. On 23 October 2013, Turkish Airlines and Euroleague Basketball agreed to extend their partnership, up until 2020.

Names of the competition

FIBA era: (1958–2001)
FIBA European Champions Cup: (1958–1991)
FIBA European League ("FIBA Euro League"): (1991–1996)
FIBA EuroLeague: (1996–2000)
FIBA SuproLeague: (2000–2001)
Euroleague Basketball era: (2000–present)
Euroleague: (2000–2016)
EuroLeague: (2016–present)
*There were two competitions during the 2000–01 season. The SuproLeague, which was organized by FIBA, and the Euroleague, which was organized by Euroleague Basketball.

Competition systems

Tournament systems
The EuroLeague operated under a tournament system, from its inaugural 1958 season, through the 2015–16 season.
FIBA European Champions Cup (1958 to 1986–87): The champions of European national domestic leagues, and the then current European Champions Cup title holders (except for the 1986–87 season), competing against each other, played in a tournament system. The league culminated with either a single game final, or a 2-game aggregate score finals (3 games if needed to break a tie).
FIBA European Champions Cup (1987–88 to 1990–91): The champions of European national domestic leagues, competing against each other, played in a tournament system. The league culminated with a Final Four.
FIBA European League (1991–92 to 1995–96): The champions of the European national domestic leagues, the then current European League title holders, along with some of the other biggest teams from the most important national domestic leagues, played in a tournament system. The league culminated with a Final Four.
FIBA EuroLeague (1996–97 to 1999–00): The champions of the best European national domestic leagues, along with some of the other biggest teams from the most important national domestic leagues, played in a tournament system. The league culminated with a Final Four.
*Euroleague (2000–01): Some of the European national domestic league champions, and some of the runners-up from various national domestic leagues, played in a tournament system. The league culminated with a best of 5 playoff finals.
*FIBA SuproLeague (2000–01): Some of the European national domestic league champions, and some of the runners-up from various national domestic leagues, played in a tournament system. The league culminated with a Final Four.
Euroleague (2001–02 to 2015–16): The champions of the best European national domestic leagues, along with some of the other biggest teams from the most important national domestic leagues, played in a tournament system. The league culminated with a Final Four.
*There were two competitions during the 2000–01 season. The SuproLeague, which was organized by FIBA, and the Euroleague, which was organized by Euroleague Basketball.

League system
Starting with the 2016–17 season, the EuroLeague operates under a league format.
EuroLeague (2016–17 to present): The champions of the best European national domestic leagues, along with some of the other biggest teams from the most important national domestic leagues, playing in a true European-wide league system format. The league culminates with a Final Four.

Format

Starting with the 2016–17 season, the EuroLeague is made up of 18 teams, with each playing every other team twice (once at home and once away) in a double round robin league regular season, for a total of 34 games played by each team.

The top 8 placed teams at the end of the regular season advance to playoffs, each playing a 5-game playoff series against a single opponent. The regular season standings are used to determine which teams play each other, and in each pairing the higher placed team has home-court advantage in the series, playing 3 of the 5 games at home. The winners of each of the four playoff series advance to the Final Four, held at a predetermined site. The Final Four features two semi-finals, a third place game, and the championship game, all on the same weekend.

Each team plays a maximum 41 games per season: 34 in the regular season, a maximum of 5 during the playoffs, and 2 in the Final Four.

Qualification
Currently (and since the suspension of Russian teams because of the Russian invasion of Ukraine), 12 out of the 18 EuroLeague places are held by licensed clubs that have long-term licenses with Euroleague Basketball, and are members of the Shareholders Executive Board. These twelve licensed clubs are:

The remaining 6 EuroLeague places are held by 6 associated clubs that have annual licences, of which one has a two-year wild card, three have one-year wild-cards and two are the finalists of the previous season's 2nd-tier European competition, the EuroCup. From the 2020/21 season, however, if the better of the two teams from the EuroCup makes it to the playoffs, it keeps the place for the following year.

Previous EuroLeague formats

European professional basketball club rankings

Arena standards
Effective as of the 2012–13 season, EuroLeague clubs with what was at the time an "A License" had to host their home EuroLeague games in arenas that had a seating capacity of at least 10,000 people. This same minimum 10,000-seat arena capacity rule, now currently applies to all EuroLeague clubs with a long-term license.

Previously, in 2008, the Euroleague Basketball had originally decided to increase the minimum arena seating requirement to 10,000, within four years time, to force EuroLeague clubs to move into and/or build bigger arenas. This was done in hopes of increasing revenues through more ticket sales. Conversely, associated clubs, must currently play in arenas that seat at least 5,000 people.

Current clubs

These are the teams that participate in the 2022–23 EuroLeague season:

Results

Team statistics

Titles by club

Titles by nation

Runner-up trophy 
From 2012–13 season, Euroleague Basketball introduced a new innovation in the lobby of team sports. They replaced the second place medals for athletes with a Runner-up trophy for the team, incorporating partially individual sports' way of awarding into a team sport. But rather than the three first places awarding system, they preferred tennis' awarding system of the two finalists. So for the first time in the history of team sports, a runner up team can celebrate a European trophy, just like the silver and bronze medal of Olympic Games Winners, satisfying the common sense of runners-up value. 

Various European Federations have moved similarly throughout the years. The LEN for example conduct a 3rd place game for the bronze medal. EuroLeague conduct a 3rd place game without awarding a medal. CEV on the other hand awards both the Runner-up & 3rd place game Winner with appropriate trophies. 

Winners of the Runner-up trophy:

Records

 Real Madrid has been the most successful team, having won the competition a record ten times.
 Split (1988–89, 1989–90, 1990–91), is the only team to have won the competition three times in a row, in the modern EuroLeague Final Four era (1987–88 season to present).
 Rīgas ASK, as a Soviet League club in the late 1950s and early 1960s (1958, 1958–59, 1959–60), is the only team to have won the competition three times in a row, in the pre-EuroLeague Final Four era.
 Real Madrid (1963–64, 1964–65) & (1966–67, 1967–68), along with Varese (1971–72, 1972–73) & (1974–75, 1975–76), are the only teams to have won the European Championship twice in a row, on two occasions, in the pre-modern EuroLeague Final Four era.
 Cantù (1981–82, 1982–83), Cibona (1984–85, 1985–86), and Olimpia Milano (1986–87, 1987–88), are the other three teams to have won the European Championship twice in a row (only for one time), in the pre-modern EuroLeague Final Four era.
 Maccabi Tel Aviv (2003–04, 2004–05), Olympiacos (2011–12, 2012–13), and Anadolu Efes (2020–21, 2021–22) are the only teams to have won the EuroLeague twice in a row, becoming back-to-back EuroLeague champions in the Euroleague Basketball era (2000–01 season to present).
 Fenerbahçe are the only team who stayed undefeated at home after a 30-game regular season and secured the best record after a regular season (25–5) under the new format (2016–17 season to present). They are also the earliest EuroLeague Playoffs qualifiers ever in the modern EuroLeague era.
 Istanbul is the only city from which nine clubs have played in the competition: Beşiktaş, Darüşşafaka, Eczacıbaşı, Efes, Fenerbahçe, Galatasaray, Istanbul Technical University, Modaspor, and Ülker have participated in the EuroLeague.
 Although Israel is located in the Middle East, its teams play in the EuroLeague, as its national federation is a member of FIBA Europe and its top professional league is a member of ULEB. (Similarly, the Israel Football Association is a member of UEFA, enabling its national team and clubs to play in UEFA competitions.)
 In a small area of less than 40 km2 (25 mi2), north of Milan, there are 3 clubs that have won a total of 10 FIBA European Champions' Cups, and played in a total of 16 finals: Pallacanestro Varese (5), Olimpia Milano (3) and Cantù (2).
 The record score differential for a EuroLeague Finals game was achieved at the 2004 Finals, in Tel Aviv, where the home club, Maccabi Tel Aviv, defeated Skipper Bologna, by a score of 118–74 (a 44-point difference).
 A crowd of 22,567, which filled Belgrade Arena on 5 March 2009, for a 2008–09 season Top 16 game between Partizan and Panathinaikos is the league's official all seated attendance record. Before that, a crowd of 18,500 all seated fans occurred at a Panathinaikos home game at the Olympic Indoor Hall, in Athens, against Tau Cerámica, on 12 April 2006, during the 2005–06 third quarterfinal playoff game. 
 The most points ever scored in a single game by an individual in the league's overall history (since 1958), is 99 points, by Radivoj Korać of OKK Beograd, on 14 January 1965, during the 1964–65 season, in a game against Alvik.
 The most points ever scored in a single game by an individual in the league since Euroleague Basketball has owned the competition (2000), is 49 points, by Shane Larkin of Efes Istanbul, on 29 November 2019, during the 2019–20 season, in a game against Bayern Munich.
 The most points ever scored in a single EuroLeague Finals game by an individual is 47 points, in the 1978–79 season, by Žarko Varajić of Bosna, in a game against Emerson Varese, on 5 April 1979.

EuroLeague awards

Statistical leaders

All-time leaders

Since the beginning of the 2000–01 season (Euroleague Basketball era):

Individual performances

EuroLeague versus NBA games

Attendances

Season averages
All averages include playoffs and Final Four games.

Historic average attendances
This list shows the averages attendances of each team since the 16-team regular season was established in 2016. All averages include playoffs games.

Individual game highest attendance

Note: Match between Panathinaikos and Barcelona on 18 April 2013, at OAKA Sports Center, was supposedly watched by about 30,000 spectators. However, it is not included in the table as the official data is 18,300.

Media coverage

The EuroLeague season is broadcast on television, and can be seen in up to 201 countries and territories. It can be seen by up to 245 million (800 million via satellite) households weekly in China.

It is also televised in the United States and Canada on NBA TV and available online through ESPN3 (in English) and ESPN Deportes (in Spanish) until 2017–18 season. From 2018 to 2019 season, the coverage is moved to FloSports.

The EuroLeague Final Four is broadcast on television in up to 213 countries and territories. The EuroLeague also has its own internet pay TV service, called EuroLeague TV.

Sponsors
Title sponsor
Turkish Airlines
Premium partners
7DAYS
Adidas
Tempobet (only in Germany)
Fonbet (only in Russia)
Nesine (only in Turkey)
bwin (Greece and Spain)

Global partners
VODA VODA
viagogo
Detur
Upper Deck
DraftKings
Kyocera
VTB Arena Park
VTB
AX Armani Exchange
Intersport
Spalding
Tadim

Regional partners
Odeabank (only in Turkey)
Head & Shoulders (only in Turkey)
SEK (only in Turkey)
Oscar Mayer (only in Spain)
Endesa (only in Spain)
youwin.tv
Global partners of the Final Four
Efes
Acıbadem

Source:

See also 

 Men's competitions
 EuroLeague
 EuroCup Basketball
 Basketball Champions League
 FIBA Europe Cup
 Women's competitions
 EuroLeague Women
 EuroCup Women
 SuperCup Women

References

External links 
 
 List of Winners with Rosters
 EuroLeague history – stats
 InterBasket.net EuroLeague basketball forum
 EuroLeague's Youtube channel

 
1
Recurring sporting events established in 1958
Recurring sporting events established in 2000
1958 establishments in Europe
2000 establishments in Europe
Multi-national professional sports leagues